Live at Reading is a live CD/DVD by American rock band Nirvana, released on November 2, 2009. It features the band's headlining performance at the Reading Festival in Reading, England, on August 30, 1992. Bootlegged for years, the new issues present the performance for the first time mastered and color corrected.

Live at Reading marks the first time that Chet Powers received songwriting credit on a Nirvana release for the use of his lyrics from the song "Get Together" as the intro for "Territorial Pissings".

Background

Nirvana's appearance at the 1992 Reading Festival was the band's second performance at the annual music festival and their first since the success of their second album Nevermind had elevated them to the position of what Pitchfork called the "biggest" rock band in the world. It was also their final concert in the United Kingdom. The band's first appearance at Reading had been on 23 August 1991, when they played an approximately 40-minute set on the afternoon of the first day of the festival, during their two-week European tour with American rock band Sonic Youth.

The 30 August 1992 concert in Reading occurred shortly after the birth of Frances Bean Cobain, the daughter of Nirvana's vocalist and guitarist Kurt Cobain and his wife Courtney Love, vocalist and guitarist of the American rock band, Hole. It was also performed amid press reports of Nirvana's possible dissolution, due to rumors of Cobain's addiction to heroin and tension within the band. Cobain discussed the rumors in the 1993 Nirvana biography Come As You Are: The Story of Nirvana by Michael Azerrad, calling them examples of "classic, typical English journalism. Sensationalism." As Nirvana's drummer Dave Grohl recalled in a 2018 interview with Kerrang!, “I remember showing up to Reading ’92 and there being so many rumours that we weren't going to play, that we had cancelled. I walked backstage and some of my best friends in bands that were opening would see me and say, ‘What are you doing here?’ And I'd go, ‘We’re fucking headlining!’ And they’d be like, ‘You're actually going to play?!’ I didn't realise there was any question that we were going to play."

With Nirvana closing the third and final night of the festival, Cobain had programmed the day's bill, which featured acts like the Melvins, the Screaming Trees, L7, Mudhoney, Teenage Fanclub (who allowed Eugenius to play one song after the tent they were due to play in blew down), Pavement, Nick Cave and the Bad Seeds and Bjorn Again, and intentionally excluded what Cobain called "lame-ass limey bands." The 1992 Reading Festival which Nirvana headlined was sold out and it was reported that the co-existing British music festival held at Donington Park had suffered an attendance loss of 10,000 as a result. According to Grohl, there was an audience of 50,000 in attendance at Nirvana's 1992 Reading Festival appearance. According to Loudersound.com, there was an audience of 60,000 in attendance at Nirvana's 1992 Reading Festival appearance.

The performance
Mocking the rumors of his poor health, Cobain was pushed onstage in a wheelchair, wearing a hospital gown and wig, by English music journalist Everett True. He was met by Nirvana's bassist Krist Novoselic, who shook his hand and told the audience that "with the support of his friends and family, he's gonna make it." Cobain pretended to struggle to his feet as he stood up in front of the microphone, sang a line from the Amanda McBroom song "The Rose," then collapsed to the ground. After lying motionless briefly, Cobain returned to his feet, put his guitar on and the band immediately started their set.

The performance included almost all of Nevermind (everything except Something in the Way), along with several songs from their 1989 debut album Bleach, the Sub Pop 200 compilation track "Spank Thru," and set list regulars "Aneurysm," "Been a Son" and the 1990 single, "Sliver." It also included a cover of the Wipers' "D-7," which had been released as a b-side on the "Lithium" single in July 1992, and Fang's "The Money Will Roll Right In." The band also performed the unreleased songs "tourette's," "All Apologies" and "Dumb," all three of which appeared on their final studio album, In Utero, in September 1993. Cobain introduced "All Apologies" by announcing, "This song is dedicated to my 12-day-old daughter, and my wife. She thinks everybody hates her,” and then encouraged the crowd to chant, "Courtney, we love you!"

Grohl later stated that hearing the 50,000 people in the audience chant the lyrics to the song "Lithium" was one of their biggest moments. The performance of "Smells Like Teen Spirit," the band's 1991 breakthrough single, incorporated part of the 1976 Boston single "More Than a Feeling" at the beginning, a reference to the similarities between the two songs' main guitar riffs. The show ended with Cobain playing the American national anthem, "The Star-Spangled Banner," and the band smashing their instruments.

The show featured the band's friend Antony Hodgkinson, nicknamed "Dancing Tony," dancing onstage for 12 of the 25 songs performed. It was the final of an estimated nine shows that Hodgkinson danced for the band, including their appearances at the 1991 Reading Festival and the 1990 Leeds Festival.

Previously-released songs

In November 1994, the performance of "Lithium" appeared on the band's first home video, Live! Tonight! Sold Out!!.

In October 1996, "tourette's" appeared on the Novoselic-compiled live compilation album, From the Muddy Banks of the Wishkah.

Amateur footage of Cobain's wheelchair entrance and performance of "The Rose," as well as the instrument destruction at the end, also appears on Live! Tonight! Sold Out!!.

Reception 

According to Metacritic, Live at Reading holds a score of 93 out of 100, indicating "universal acclaim" and it is ranked 18th on the site's list of best-reviewed albums, and first among alternative albums.

Stuart Berman of Pitchfork called Live at Reading "an indispensable document of a legendary band at their most invincible." Joe Gross of Spin called the set "a mindblower," describing it as "sloppy indie rock as stadium-filling psychedelic punk." Allmusic's Stephen Thomas Erlewine praised the release as "Nirvana's purest blast of rock & roll" and called it "one of the greatest live rock & roll albums ever."

Cobain himself expressed satisfaction with the performance, giving it "an eight on a scale of ten," according to Come As You Are. Looking back at the set in 2018, Grohl called it "a really reassuring, genuinely magical moment of everything coming together at the right time," despite the band's lack of sufficient practice for the show.

The CD version of Live at Reading debuted at number 37 on the Billboard 200 in the U.S., while the DVD debuted at number 1 in the top 40 on the magazine's Top Music Video Chart, remaining in the top 40 for 25 weeks. Nielson SoundScan reported that, as of 2016 the Live at Reading album has sold 148,000 copies in the United States alone.

Track listing 
All tracks written by Kurt Cobain, except where noted.

"Breed" – 2:57
"Drain You" – 3:54
"Aneurysm"  – 4:34
"School" – 3:12
"Sliver" – 2:13
"In Bloom" – 4:33
"Come as You Are" – 3:34
"Lithium" – 4:23
"About a Girl" – 3:09
"tourette's" – 1:51
"Polly" – 2:48
"Lounge Act" – 3:04
"Smells Like Teen Spirit"  – 4:44 (DVD version includes Boston's "More Than a Feeling" intro – 5:30)
"On a Plain" – 3:00
"Negative Creep" – 2:54
"Been a Son" – 3:23
"All Apologies" – 3:25
"Blew" – 5:23

Encore
"Dumb" – 2:34
"Stay Away" – 3:41
"Spank Thru" – 3:05
"Love Buzz"  – 4:56 (DVD version only, Shocking Blue cover)
"The Money Will Roll Right In"  – 2:13 (Fang cover)
"D-7"  – 3:43 (Wipers cover)
"Territorial Pissings"  – 4:30

Personnel 
Kurt Cobain – vocals, guitar
Krist Novoselic – bass guitar,  backing vocals on "The Money Will Roll Right In"
Dave Grohl – drums,  backing vocals
Antony Hodgkinson – dancer

Production
Nirvana – executive producers
Michael Meisel – producer
John Silva – producer
Jeff Fura – DVD producer
Nathaniel Kunkel – 5.1 surround and stereo mixes
Bob Ludwig – audio mastering at Gateway Mastering
Concert originally filmed by Fujisankei Communications International
CCI Digital West – DVD production facility
Kelly McFadden – menu design
Matt Ferguson – authoring
Jared J. White – editorial
Vartan – art direction
Ryan Rogers at Oddopolis – design
Charles Peterson – photography
Monique McGuffin Newman – production manager
Adam Starr – product manager

Charts

Weekly charts

DVD charts

Certifications

Album certifications

DVD certifications

References

External links 

Live at Reading at YouTube (streamed copy where licensed)

Nirvana (band) video albums
Live albums published posthumously
Nirvana (band) live albums
2009 live albums
2009 video albums
Live video albums
Geffen Records live albums
Geffen Records video albums
Video albums published posthumously
Bootleg recordings